Pete Sampras Tennis is a sports video game, developed by Zeppelin Games and published by Codemasters. It was followed by Sampras Tennis 96 for Sega's 16-bit console and later by Pete Sampras Tennis '97, released for the PlayStation and Windows/DOS.

Gameplay

While Pete Sampras Tennis uses all three control pad buttons, the game play remains simple yet realistic, for its time. While serving, the A button sends the ball automatically, and B allows the player to control the ball speed and direction, and is the only way to score aces against the best players. During play, A lobs, B sends a normal shot and C, if pressed alone performs a top spin shot, if in conjunction with left or right on the D-Pad the player dives in that direction. It is also possible to aim the ball by pressing any direction on the D-Pad before there is contact between the racket and the ball.

Expert players are able to win against any computer player without giving a point away, since the AI isn't very well developed (and there are no difficulty options) and it's hard to miss a ball. The most usual tactic is to lure the opponent into the net (by making low shots), and then expect he bounces against a mid-height ball close to the net, or if he manages to return, call in a long lob, leaving the opponent with no chances of returning the ball. With harder-hitting characters, it is possible to make strong and accurate returns after the serve, which the computer-controlled player rarely manages to return.

While managing to make perfect use of the lob and spinning shot aim is essential to play the game, top spins can be more a nuisance than helpful. Since it shares the same button as dives, and a good top spin shot requires additional power control (by either pressing up or down), Sega's 8-direction pads, if broken or dirty, or even simply if the user's finger slipped, top spin shots often ended up turning into a dive, the ball passing uselessly by the helpless player.

Characters
The only real tennis player is Pete Sampras. All players, however, have different ratings for base line, service, speed and volleys, and there is a noticeable difference between left- and right-handed players. Not all players can be used in the World Tour mode, as some of them are actual opponents.

Events

There are only three surfaces to choose from (Grass, Hard and Clay). Although the surfaces are not sufficiently differentiated to impinge on AI or player tactics, the bounce of the ball is lowest on Grass and highest on Clay, with Hard intermediate.  There are several places where matches and tournaments in the Huge Tour take place, and they are accurate on the kind of surface that tournament actually uses: London (Wimbledon) is played on grass, Paris (Roland Garros) on clay, New York (Flushing Meadows) on hard court, etc. Each surface has three different sets, with the scoreboard on the left, right or middle. This is probably one indication of the court in use: most games during Huge Tour tournaments are played in the sided scoreboard courts, except the final.

Game modes
The game has three main modes: Challenge match, Tournament and World Tour. By inserting the Zeppelin password, two extra modes are unlocked: Crazy Tennis and Huge Tour.

Main modes
Challenge matches are simple head-to-head matches, where everything can be customized, from game length (1/3/5 sets), location and the kind of game (singles or doubles). All players can be chosen (including opponents in the World Tour), and if the J-Cart is in use, 4 players can play simultaneously.

Tournament is the "party" mode. From four to eight players can compete head to head in a knockout competition until the best two matchup in the final. Although it is not possible to change the match length (5 sets only),   each player can choose a handicap, from none to three sets.

The single-player only game mode, called World Tour, is a one set only, composed by 18 rounds across the globe. Some of the players are not available (Sampras included) since they are opponents during the tournament. Since the game is easy, this mode can be beaten in few days.

Extra modes
Crazy Tennis is one arcade-ish mode where players get points from simply hitting the ball. There is one overall sense of wackiness in this mode, as some lower balls are blocked by a popup racket on the net, some powerups increase the size of the ball or allow direct control of its path, and there is even a cameo from Dizzy, who walks on the net and works as a piñata. After five hits Dizzy breaks, giving several points to the last player who hit the ball. Players can get points from hitting the ball, breaking Dizzy and winning the point, which aggregates all the points played since the last service (which is done automatically by a machine, instead of a player). The game is timed, and both players must achieve the target score - if one of them reaches the timer without the required score, the game ends and the player  with the higher score is declared winner.

The Huge Tour mode is a complete competition, nearly a season simulation. There are both men, women and mixed tournaments, for the highest rewarded a minimum place in the ranking is required. In order to win the Australian Open (the season opener) one must first complete a season first. Up to eight players can compete at the same time, the match length is the official: five sets for men, three for women.

Reception 

Next Generation reviewed the Genesis version of the game, rating it two stars out of five, and stated that "Pete Sampras Tennis is an action-oriented tennis game without much action".

References

1994 video games
Codemasters games
Sega Genesis games
Game Gear games
Tennis video games
Multiplayer and single-player video games
Video games based on real people
Cultural depictions of Pete Sampras
Video games developed in the United Kingdom